Byler Road is the oldest public road in Alabama still in use today. Constructed in the mid-1820s, it connected Courtland near the Tennessee River with Tuscaloosa near the Black Warrior River. The road spurred development in Lawrence, Winston, Walker, and Fayette counties, and was traveled by both Union and Confederate armies during the Civil War. A half-mile section of the road in Tuscaloosa County was added to the National Register of Historic Places in 1974.

References

External links
Alabama Department of Archives and History
Byler Road taken via Dual Sport Motorcycle - 2:36 discussion begins at 2:48

Historic trails and roads in Alabama
National Register of Historic Places in Tuscaloosa County, Alabama
Roads on the National Register of Historic Places in Alabama